Broye-Vully District is a district in Vaud Canton in Switzerland.

Geography
Of this area,  or 65.5% is used for agricultural purposes, while  or 21.5% is forested.

Demographics

In  there were 280 live births to Swiss citizens and 116 births to non-Swiss citizens, and in same time span there were 277 deaths of Swiss citizens and 19 non-Swiss citizen deaths.  Ignoring immigration and emigration, the population of Swiss citizens increased by 3 while the foreign population increased by 97.  There were 41 Swiss men and 62 Swiss women who immigrated back to Switzerland.  At the same time, there were 263 non-Swiss men and 274 non-Swiss women who immigrated from another country to Switzerland.  The total Swiss population change in 2008 (from all sources, including moves across municipal borders) was an increase of 382 and the non-Swiss population increased by 442 people.  This represents a population growth rate of 2.4%.

The age distribution in Broye-Vully, was as follows:

Mergers and name changes
On 1 September 2006, the Avenches district (District d'Avenches), Moudon district (District de Moudon), (District d'Oron) and Payerne district (District de Payerne) were all dissolved and merged into the Broye-Vully district.

 The municipalities of Avenches, Bellerive (VD), Chabrey, Constantine, Cudrefin, Faoug, Montmagny, Mur, Oleyres, Vallamand and Villars-le-Grand came from the Avenches district.  
 The municipalities of Brenles, Bussy-sur-Moudon, Chavannes-sur-Moudon, Chesalles-sur-Moudon, Cremin, Curtilles, Dompierre, Forel-sur-Lucens, Hermenches, Lovatens, Lucens, Moudon, Oulens-sur-Lucens, Prévonloup, Rossenges, Sarzens, Syens, Villars-le-Comte and Vucherens came from the Moudon district (District de Moudon).  
 The municipalities of Carrouge, Corcelles-le-Jorat, Ropraz and Vulliens came from the Oron district (District d'Oron).  
 The municipalities of Cerniaz (VD), Champtauroz, Chevroux, Combremont-le-Grand, Combremont-le-Petit, Corcelles-près-Payerne, Grandcour, Granges-près-Marnand, Henniez, Marnand, Missy, Payerne, Sassel, Seigneux, Trey, Treytorrens (Payerne), Villars-Bramard and Villarzel came from the Payerne district (District de Payerne).
 On 1 July 2011, the municipalities of Cerniaz, Combremont-le-Grand, Combremont-le-Petit, Granges-près-Marnand, Marnand, Sassel, Seigneux and Villars-Bramard merged into the new municipality of Valbroye.  The municipalities of Bellerive, Chabrey, Constantine, Montmagny, Mur (VD), Vallamand and Villars-le-Grand merged into the new municipality of Vully-les-Lacs.
 On 1 July 2016, the municipality of Carrouge and the municipalities of Mézières and Ferlens in the Lavaux-Oron District merged to form Jorat-Mézières in the other district.
 On 1 January 2017 the former municipalities of Brenles, Chesalles-sur-Moudon, Cremin, Forel-sur-Lucens and Sarzens merged into the municipality of Lucens.

Politics
In the 2007 federal election the most popular party was the SVP which received 30.09% of the vote.  The next three most popular parties were the FDP (22.1%), the SP (19.16%) and the Green Party (9.97%).  In the federal election, a total of 9,180 votes were cast, and the voter turnout was 44.1%.

Municipalities
<div style="padding:1em 20px 1em 20px; color:#000000;text-align:left;">

References

External links
Broye-Vully - Communes du district . Canton du Vaud. Retrieved on 2008-06-19.

Districts of the canton of Vaud